The 1979 Minnesota Twins season was a season in American baseball. The team finished 82–80, fourth in the American League West.

Offseason 
In January 1979, the Twins attempted to trade first baseman Rod Carew to the New York Yankees in exchange for Chris Chambliss, Juan Beníquez, Dámaso García, and Dave Righetti, but were unable to finalize a deal. Carew would instead be traded to the California Angels on February 3.

Notable transactions 
 October 3, 1978: Dave Johnson was released by the Twins.
 December 4, 1978: Dan Ford was traded by the Twins to the California Angels for Ron Jackson and Danny Goodwin.
 December 8, 1978: Greg Field (minors) and a player to be named later were traded by the Twins to the New York Mets for Jerry Koosman. The Twins completed the deal by sending Jesse Orosco to the Mets on February 7, 1979.
 January 6, 1979: Mike Marshall was signed as a free agent by the Twins.
 February 3, 1979: Rod Carew was traded by the Twins to the California Angels for Ken Landreaux, Dave Engle, Paul Hartzell, and Brad Havens.

Regular season 
Three Minnesota Twins homered in the May 15 win over Texas, the sixteenth straight Minnesota game with at least one Twins homer.  The streak will end on May 16.  Nine players homered 28 times during the club's record-setting streak.

Only one Twins player made the All-Star Game: shortstop Roy Smalley. Smalley hit 24 HR, drove in 95 runs, and scored 85 runs, all team-leading totals. Ken Landreaux, acquired in the Carew trade, batted .305 with 15 HR and 83 RBI. Ron Jackson, acquired in the Dan Ford trade, hit 14 HR and collected 68 RBI.

Reliever Mike Marshall continued as manager Gene Mauch's all-purpose reliever, pitching in a league-leading 90 games, racking up 10 relief wins along with a league-leading 32 saves. Veteran Jerry Koosman won 20 games. Dave Goltz (14-13) and Geoff Zahn (13-7) had double-digit wins.

Smalley turned 144 double plays this year, setting a major league record for shortstops.  The team total of 203 double plays set a new season record.

Third baseman John Castino shared the AL Rookie of the Year award with Alfredo Griffin of the Toronto Blue Jays.  Each received 7 first place votes.

1,070,521 fans attended Twins games, the fourth lowest total in the American League. It was only the second time since 1970 the team attracted over one million fans.

Season standings

Record vs. opponents

Notable transactions 
 June 5, 1979: 1979 Major League Baseball draft
Randy Bush was drafted by the Twins in the 2nd round.
Mike Kinnunen was drafted by the Twins in the 10th round.
 June 29, 1979: Rudy Meoli was purchased by the Twins from the Philadelphia Phillies.
 July 25, 1979: Craig Kusick was purchased from the Twins by the Toronto Blue Jays.

Roster

Player stats

Batting

Starters by position 
Note: Pos = Position; G = Games played; AB = At bats; H = Hits; Avg. = Batting average; HR = Home runs; RBI = Runs batted in

Other batters 
Note: G = Games played; AB = At bats; H = Hits; Avg. = Batting average; HR = Home runs; RBI = Runs batted in

Pitching

Starting pitchers 
Note: G = Games pitched; IP = Innings pitched; W = Wins; L = Losses; ERA = Earned run average; SO = Strikeouts

Other pitchers 
Note: G = Games pitched; IP = Innings pitched; W = Wins; L = Losses; ERA = Earned run average; SO = Strikeouts

Relief pitchers 
Note: G = Games pitched; W = Wins; L = Losses; SV = Saves; ERA = Earned run average; SO = Strikeouts

Farm system

Notes

References 

Player stats from www.baseball-reference.com
Team info from www.baseball-almanac.com

Minnesota Twins seasons
Minnesota Twins season
Minnesota Twins